The 57th Golden Globe Awards, honoring the best in film and television for 1999, took place on Sunday January 23, 2000. The nominations were announced on December 20, 1999.

Winners and nominees

Film 

The following films received multiple nominations:

The following films received multiple wins:

Television
The following programs received multiple nominations:

The following programs received multiple wins:

Ceremony

Presenters 

 Ben Affleck
 Alec Baldwin
 Antonio Banderas
 Angela Bassett
 Lara Flynn Boyle
 Lorraine Bracco
 Rubin Carter
 Michael Douglas
 Minnie Driver
 David James Elliott
 Edie Falco
 Harrison Ford
 Vivica A. Fox
 Morgan Freeman
 James Gandolfini
 Hugh Grant
 Seth Green
 Mariska Hargitay
 Jennifer Love Hewitt
 Diane Lane
 Lucy Liu
 LL Cool J
 Courtney Love
 Shirley MacLaine
 Tobey Maguire
 Dylan McDermott
 Liam Neeson
 Gwyneth Paltrow
 Dennis Quaid
 Julia Roberts
 Ray Romano
 Keri Russell
 Winona Ryder
 Claudia Schiffer
 George Segal
 Martin Sheen
 Steven Spielberg
 Charlize Theron
 Renée Zellweger

Cecil B. DeMille Award 
Barbra Streisand

Miss Golden Globe 
Liza Huber (daughter of Susan Lucci & Helmut Huber)

Awards breakdown 
The following networks received multiple nominations:

The following networks received multiple wins:

See also
72nd Academy Awards
20th Golden Raspberry Awards
6th Screen Actors Guild Awards
51st Primetime Emmy Awards
52nd Primetime Emmy Awards
 53rd British Academy Film Awards
 54th Tony Awards
 1999 in film
 1999 in American television

References

 

Golden
1999 film awards
1999 television awards
057
January 2000 events in the United States